Julie Greenwald is an American music executive and Chairwoman and COO of Atlantic Records.

Early life
Julie Greenwald was born to a Jewish family in Catskill Mountains, New York. She graduated from Tulane University in 1992, double majoring in Political Science and English.

Career
Julie's contributions at Atlantic Records include launching the following artists, Bruno Mars, Ed Sheeran and Cardi B. She got her start as a music executive at Def Jam Recordings in 1992 and became President of The Island Def Jam Music Group in 2002.

In 2004, she was named President of Atlantic Records and in 2006, was promoted to Chairman and COO of Atlantic Records.

Awards
 Billboard Women in Music: #1 Woman of Year (2010)
 Billboard Women in Music: Executive of Year Honors (2015 & 2016)
 Billboard Women in Music: Executives of the Year (2017)
 Billboard Power 100 (2022)

References

Atlantic Records
Living people
American Jews
American music industry executives
American women in business
American entertainment industry businesspeople
American music managers
Businesspeople from New York (state)
Tulane University alumni
Year of birth missing (living people)
21st-century American women